KOSEN-1 is a technology demonstration satellite that will test the deployment of an antenna for observing radio waves emitted from the planet Jupiter. It is a 2U CubeSat, and carries a  antenna. The CubeSat was jointly developed by the National Institute of Technologies in Japan. National Institute of Technologies is known as 'kosen' in Japanese. KOSEN-1 was launched on 9 November 2021 by an Epsilon launch vehicle, as part of the Innovative Satellite Technology Demonstration-2 mission.

See also 

List of CubeSats

References

External links 
 KOSEN-1

Satellites of Japan
Technology demonstration satellites
Spacecraft launched in 2021
2021 in Japan